Daniel Webster Waugh (March 7, 1842 – March 14, 1921) was an American lawyer and  Civil War veteran who served two terms as a U.S. Representative from Indiana from 1891 to 1895.

Early life and career
Waugh was born Daniel Webster Waugh near Bluffton, Indiana to Archibald Burnett Waugh (1812-1881) and Nancy Sutton (1818-1864), one of four boys and attended local schools. He entered into the military in 1861 by enlisting in the Union Army. Waugh served in Company A, 34th Indiana Infantry Regiment and he was honorably discharged in September 1864.

He married Alice Elizabeth Grove on March 7, 1870. She was born December 1852 in Ohio. She died January 13, 1928 in Tipton, Indiana and was buried there. They had four children, three daughters who lived to maturity.

Law
Waugh was both a teacher and a farmer before being admitted to the bar in 1866. He moved to Tipton, Indiana in 1867, where he practiced law. He also served as a judge of the thirty-sixth judicial circuit from 1884 to 1890.

Political career
He was elected as a Republican to the Fifty-second and Fifty-third Congresses (March 4, 1891 – March 3, 1895). He declined candidacy for his renomination in 1894.

Final years
He practiced law until his retirement. He died in Tipton on March 14, 1921. He is interred in the mausoleum adjoining Green Lawn Cemetery.

References

1842 births
1921 deaths
People of Indiana in the American Civil War
People from Wells County, Indiana
Indiana state court judges
Union Army soldiers
People from Tipton, Indiana
Republican Party members of the United States House of Representatives from Indiana